Critical Reviews in Clinical Laboratory Sciences is a peer-reviewed medical journal that publishes review articles on all aspects of clinical laboratory sciences on an invitation-only basis. The journal is published by Taylor and Francis and the editor-in-chief is Khosrow Adeli (University of Toronto).

According to the Journal Citation Reports, the journal has a 2019 impact factor of 4.677.

References

External links

Publications established in 1970
English-language journals
Taylor & Francis academic journals
Laboratory medicine journals
Review journals